This is a list of Stoic philosophers, ordered (roughly) by date.  The criteria for inclusion in this list are fairly mild. See also :Category:Stoic philosophers.

Timeline

See also

 List of ancient Greek philosophers
 List of ancient Platonists
 List of Cynic philosophers
 List of Epicurean philosophers

 
Stoic
Stoic philosophers